A V formation is a symmetric V- or chevron-shaped flight formation. In nature, it occurs among geese, swans, ducks, and other migratory birds, improving their energy efficiency, while in human aviation, it is used mostly in military aviation, air shows, and occasionally commercial aviation.

Flying in the V formation is proven to improve energy efficiency. Usually, large birds fly in this formation since smaller birds create more complex wind currents that are hard for the back to take advantage of. V formations also improve the fuel efficiency of aircraft.

Aerodynamics
The V formation possibly improves the efficiency of flying birds, particularly over long migratory routes. This allows the birds after to take the upwash lift force due to the wingtip vortices at the tip of the wings of the lead bird. The upwash assists each bird in supporting its own weight in flight, in the same way a glider can climb or maintain height indefinitely in rising air. The birds are able to find the place where the uplift is the most desirable either by sight or by sensing the airflow by their feathers, scientists suspect.

Previous studies found that birds can use less than 20 to 30 percent of energy. According to a 1970 paper, in a V formation of 25 members, each bird can achieve a reduction of induced drag and as a result increase their range by 71%. In a 2001 Nature study, researchers used trackers on pelicans and yielded the results that pelicans flying alone have higher heart rate and flap their wings more frequently compare to those flying in V formation.

Flight characteristics 
In a V formation, some birds prefer to fly at the left, some at the right, and some at the center. The birds flying at the tips and at the front are rotated in a timely cyclical fashion to spread flight fatigue equally among the flock members. Canada geese, ducks and swans commonly form a skein in V formation. Thus, the flight formation variates around a V-like shape and does not stay constant.

Flying in V formation is not only about position but also about the timing of flapping. The birds behind will sync with the flapping pattern of the leading bird to follow the trail of upwash left by the bird at front. Whenever a bird flies to be directly behind another, it will reverse the flapping pattern to counter the downwash force.

Through an experiment with ibises, researchers found that flying in V formation is a skill that they were not born with. When they first flew together, they did not fly in a V shape. However, over time, they started learning how to fly in this formation as if they were self-taught or they learned by observing other ibises.

Applications

Military flight 

The "V", or "Vic" formation is a basic flight formation for military aircraft in many air forces. The Vic formation is also common in ceremonial flyovers and airshow flights.

Similar aerodynamics advantage was attempted to be utilized by engineers and research pilots. The airflow from wingtips of the aircraft can provide upward lift force for the planes behind, providing more efficient flight. NASA’s Dryden Flight Research Center initiated the NASA Autonomous Formation Flight program, which involved a Formation Flight Instrumentation System that uses GPS to allow the aircraft to be position at precise formation location automatically. The goal of this program was to save a sustained 10 percent of fuel, and experimental data suggested that as high as 15 percent could be achieved. Such fuel reduction can also reduce the amount of pollution released into the environment.

Air Mobility Command, which accounts for 20 percent of all avionic fuel usage by the United States federal government, is also experimenting with autopilot changes to find the best tradeoff between the reduced drag of 'vortex surfing' and the resulting 'ride qualities' of flying through another aircraft's wake.

Commercial flight 
Airbus has made efforts to reduce fuel consumption in commercial aviation through its fello’fly project, where two commercial aircraft fly in a V formation. Since large aircraft at high speed generate immense vortices at their wings, two aircraft will fly approximately 1 and a half to 2 miles apart, near the smooth current of updraft. Thus, significant fuel can be saved without compromising passenger comfort.

Test flights were done using two AS350 Écureuil helicopters, and the results showed that 5 percent to 10 percent of fuel can be reduced for the second aircraft per trip. This percentage per flight means several tons of jet fuel and carbon dioxide emissions. Nevertheless, operational and financial concerns and savings between airlines need to be addressed, as well as the schedules of position and altitude data for planes with similar routes to fly together.

Birds that fly in V formation 
This list is not comprehensive as it does not cover all birds that fly in V formation.
Geese 
 Swans
 Gulls
 Cranes 
 Pelicans 
 Cormorants 
 Ibis
 Ducks

Past studies and findings

 Wieselsberger (1914): An aerodynamicist who was the first to suggest that a formation may give birds an aerodynamic advantage. From the principles of aerodynamics, he knew that birds generate Bernoulli lift because of the upwash and downwash at the edges of their wings. He proposed that birds flying in a V formation make use of the upwash of neighboring birds to reduce induced drag, and hence conserve energy in flight.
 Hamilton (1967): Posited that the staggered formation provides an advantage for visual communication with neighboring birds. At the same time, it also provides a clear viewing field during flight. 
 Lissaman & Schollenberger (1970): Conducted experiments to give a quantitative approximation of the energy saved. Through their study, they concluded that a formation of 25 birds can increase the birds' range by up to 71% as compared to just one bird.
 Willis et al. (2007): Sought to examine the energy savings in flight with respect to positioning and wing beat phase relationships between two adjacent birds. The results showed that optimal flapping of each bird accounts for up to 20% energy savings.

References

Bibliography
Holmes, Tony. Spitfire vs Bf 109: Battle of Britain. Oxford, UK/ New York: Osprey, 2007. .

External links
Migrating birds real flight V-formation spatial configuration. Real Dataset from North German bird migration photo).  

Bird migration
Bird flight